This page lists princely families in the territories of the Austro-Hungarian Empire, whether extant or extinct. The style of address was Durchlaucht (Serene Highness); also used was Fürstliche Gnaden (Princely Grace). The Austrian princely title (Fürst) was the most prestigious title of the Austrian nobility, forming the higher nobility (hoher Adel) alongside the counts (Grafen). This close inner circle, called the 100 Familien (100 families), possessed enormous riches and lands. They also had great influence at the court and thus played an important role in politics and diplomacy.

References 

Austria-Hungary
Princes